Sign Of Victory is the second album of the glam metal band Buster Brown. It is the only Buster Brown album to feature drummer James Kottak.

After this album, singer Johnny Edwards and drummer James Kottak were recruited by guitarist Ronnie Montrose into his band Montrose. They played on Montrose's Mean album.

The song "Dirty Girl" resembles the Sweet Savage song "Straight Through The Heart" and, to a lesser extent, the Dio song "Caught In The Middle". The song "Monkey Bars" is a cover of the song originally done by Canadian rock band Coney Hatch.

Track listing
 Let's Rock
 Save Your Love
 Dirty Girl
 Monkey Bars
 Devil In Her Eyes
 Streetwalker
 Bounty Hunter
 Sign Of Victory

Personnel
 Johnny Edwards: Lead Vocals
 Allan Phelps: Guitar
 Kevin Downs: Bass
 James Kottak: Drums

Buster Brown (band) albums
1985 albums